Gorki Ridge is a ridge about  long forming the east wall of Schussel Cirque in the Humboldt Mountains of Queen Maud Land, Antarctica. It was discovered and plotted from air photos by the Third German Antarctic Expedition, 1938–39, and mapped from air photos and surveys by the Sixth Norwegian Antarctic Expedition, 1956–60. It was remapped by the Soviet Antarctic Expedition, 1960–61, and named after Soviet author A.M. Gorki.

References

Ridges of Queen Maud Land
Humboldt Mountains (Antarctica)